Ladysmith is a village approximately 19 km east of Wagga Wagga in the Riverina region of New South Wales, Australia. At the 2016 census, Ladysmith had a population of 352 people.

Ladysmith was formerly within the Shire of Kyeamba until 1 January 1981 when the Shire was amalgamated with the Shire of Mitchell into the City of Wagga Wagga.

The disused Wagga Wagga to Tumbarumba railway line runs through Ladysmith. Ladysmith railway station heritage precinct is maintained by the Wagga Wagga-based railway preservation group, Tumba Rail. The group is working to again operate trikes in the railway yard on weekends, hopefully in the near future.

Ladysmith Post Office opened on 20 November 1899.
The district which was formally called Alfredtown was changed after the community petitioned to rename it Ladysmith, In honour of Sarah Ann Smith (née Apps) wife of Charles Thomas Smith both resided at “Green Meadow” for all the work the family did within their community.

Gallery

Notes and references

External links
 Ladysmith Rail Station

Wagga Wagga
Towns in New South Wales